Harold Fidock (24 August 1902 – 9 February 1986) was an Australian cricketer. He played three first-class matches for Western Australia between 1924/25 and 1929/30.

See also
 List of Western Australia first-class cricketers

References

External links
 

1902 births
1986 deaths
Australian cricketers
Western Australia cricketers
Cricketers from Adelaide